The Summer Olympic Games, also known as the Games of the Olympiad, and often referred to as the Summer Olympics, is a major international multi-sport event normally held once every four years. The inaugural Games took place in 1896 in Athens, Greece, and the most recent Games were held in 2021 in Tokyo, Japan. The International Olympic Committee (IOC) is responsible for organising the Games and for overseeing the host city's preparations. The tradition of awarding medals began in 1904; in each Olympic event, gold medals are awarded for first place, silver medals for second place, and bronze medals for third place. The Winter Olympic Games were created out of the success of the Summer Olympic Games, which are regarded as the largest and most prestigious multi-sport international event in the world.

The Summer Olympics have increased in scope from a 42-event competition programme in 1896 with fewer than 250 male competitors from 14 different nations, to 339 events in 2021 with 11,420 competitors (almost half of whom were women) from 206 nations. The Games have been held in nineteen different countries over five continents: four times in the United States (1904, 1932, 1984, and 1996); three times in Great Britain (1908, 1948, and 2012); twice each in Greece (1896 and 2004), France (1900 and 1924), Germany (1936 and 1972), Australia (1956 and 2000), and Japan (1964 and 2020); and once each in Sweden (1912), Belgium (1920), the Netherlands (1928), Finland (1952), Italy (1960), Mexico (1968), Canada (1976), the Soviet Union (1980), South Korea (1988), Spain (1992), China (2008), and Brazil (2016).

London was the first city to host the Summer Olympic Games three times. , Paris, Los Angeles, Athens and Tokyo have each hosted twice; Paris will host for the third time in 2024, followed by Los Angeles which will host the Games in 2028. Only five countries have participated in every Summer Olympic Games: Australia, France, Great Britain, Greece, and Switzerland. Australia, France and Great Britain have won at least a medal at every edition of the Games, with Great Britain as the only one to win gold each time. The United States leads the all-time medal count at the Summer Olympics, and has topped the medal table on 18 separate occasions—followed by the USSR (six times), and France, Great Britain, Germany, China, and the ex-Soviet 'Unified Team' (once each).

Hosting

The United States  hosted the Summer Olympic Games four times: the 1904 Games were held in St. Louis, Missouri; the 1932 and 1984 Games were both held in Los Angeles, California, and the 1996 Games were held in Atlanta, Georgia. The 2028 Games in Los Angeles will mark the fifth occasion on which the Summer Games have been hosted by the U.S.

In 2012, Great Britain hosted its third Summer Olympic Games in London, which became the first city ever to have hosted the Summer Olympic Games three times. The cities of Los Angeles, Paris, and Athens (excluding 1906) have each hosted two Summer Olympic Games. In 2024, France will host its third Summer Olympic Games in its capital, making Paris the second city ever to have hosted three Summer Olympics. And in 2028, Los Angeles will in turn become the third city ever to have hosted the Games three times.

Australia, France, Germany, Greece and Japan all hosted the Summer Olympic Games twice (with France and Australia planned to host in 2024 and 2032, respectively, taking both countries to three each). Tokyo, Japan, hosted the 2020 Games and became the first city outside the predominantly English-speaking and European nations to have hosted the Summer Olympics twice, having already hosted the Games in 1964; it is also the largest city ever to have hosted, having grown considerably since 1964. The other countries to have hosted the Summer Olympics are Belgium, Brazil, Canada, China, Finland, Italy, Mexico, Netherlands, South Korea, Soviet Union, Spain, and Sweden, with each of these countries having hosted the Summer Games on one occasion.

Asia has hosted the Summer Olympics four times: in Tokyo (1964 and 2020), Seoul (1988), and Beijing (2008).

The 2016 Games in Rio de Janeiro, Brazil, were the first Summer Olympics to be held in South America and the first that was held completely during the local "winter" season. The only two countries in the Southern Hemisphere to have hosted the Summer Olympics have been Australia (1956, 2000, and upcoming 2032) and Brazil (2016), with Africa having yet to host any Summer Olympics.

Stockholm, Sweden, has hosted events at two Summer Olympics, having been sole host of the 1912 Games, and hosting the equestrian events at the 1956 Summer Olympics (which they are credited as jointly hosting with Melbourne, Australia). Amsterdam, Netherlands, has also hosted events at two Summer Olympic Games, having been sole host of the 1928 Games and previously hosting two of the sailing races at the 1920 Summer Olympics. At the 2008 Summer Olympics, Hong Kong provided the venues for the equestrian events, which took place in Sha Tin and Kwu Tung.

History

Early years

The International Olympic Committee (IOC) was founded in 1894 when Pierre de Coubertin, a French pedagogue and historian, sought to promote international understanding through sporting competition. The first edition of The Olympic Games was held in Athens in 1896 and attracted just 245 competitors, of whom more than 200 were Greek, and only 14 countries were represented. Nevertheless, no international events of this magnitude had been organised before. Female athletes were not allowed to compete, though one woman, Stamata Revithi, ran the marathon course on her own, saying "If the committee doesn't let me compete I will go after them regardless".

The 1896 Summer Olympics, officially known as the Games of the Olympiad, was an international multi-sport event which was celebrated in Athens, Greece, from 6 to 15 April 1896. It was the first Olympic Games held in the modern era. About 100,000 people attended for the opening of the games. The athletes came from 14 nations, with most coming from Greece. Although Greece had the most athletes, the U.S. finished with the most champions. 11 Americans placed first in their events vs. the 10 from Greece. Ancient Greece was the birthplace of the Olympic Games, consequently Athens was perceived to be an appropriate choice to stage the inaugural modern Games. It was unanimously chosen as the host city during a congress organised by Pierre de Coubertin in Paris, on 23 June 1894. The IOC was also established during this congress.

Despite many obstacles and setbacks, the 1896 Olympics were regarded as a great success. The Games had the largest international participation of any sporting event to that date. Panathinaiko Stadium, the first big stadium in the modern world, overflowed with the largest crowd ever to watch a sporting event. The highlight for the Greeks was the marathon victory by their compatriot Spiridon Louis, a water carrier. He won in 2 hours, 58 minutes and 50 seconds, setting off wild celebrations at the stadium. The most successful competitor was German wrestler and gymnast Carl Schuhmann, who won four gold medals.

Greek officials and the public were enthusiastic about the experience of hosting an Olympic Games. This feeling was shared by many of the athletes, who even demanded that Athens be the permanent Olympic host city. The IOC intended for subsequent Games to be rotated to various host cities around the world. The second Olympics was held in Paris.

Four years later the 1900 Summer Olympics in Paris attracted more than four times as many athletes, including 20 women, who were allowed to officially compete for the first time, in croquet, golf, sailing, and tennis. The Games were integrated with the Paris World's Fair and lasted over five months. It has been disputed which exact events were Olympic, as some events were for professionals, some had restricted eligibility, and others lacked international competitors.

Tensions caused by the Russo–Japanese War and the difficulty of getting to St. Louis may have contributed to the fact that very few top-ranked athletes from outside the US and Canada took part in the 1904 Games.

The "Second International Olympic Games in Athens", as they were called at the time, were held in 1906. The IOC does not currently recognise these games as being official Olympic Games, although many historians do and credit the 1906 games with preventing the demise of the Olympics. The 1906 Athens games were the first of an alternating series of games to be held in Athens in even non-Olympic years, but the series failed to materialise. The games were more successful than the 1900 and 1904 games, with over 850 athletes competing, and contributed positively to the success of future games.

The 1908 London Games saw numbers rise again, as well as the first running of the marathon over its now-standard distance of 42.195  km (26 miles 385 yards). The first Olympic Marathon in 1896 (a male-only race) was raced at a distance of 40  km (24 miles 85 yards). The new marathon distance was chosen to ensure that the race finished in front of the box occupied by the British royal family. Thus the marathon had been  for the first games in 1896, but was subsequently varied by up to  due to local conditions such as street and stadium layout. At the six Olympic games between 1900 and 1920, the marathon was raced over six distances. The Games saw Great Britain winning 146 medals, 99 more than second-placed Americans, its best result to this day.

At the end of the 1908 marathon, the Italian runner Dorando Pietri was first to enter the stadium, but he was clearly in distress and collapsed of exhaustion before he could complete the event. He was helped over the finish line by concerned race officials and later disqualified for that. As compensation for the missing medal, Queen Alexandra gave Pietri a gilded silver cup. Arthur Conan Doyle wrote a special report about the race in the Daily Mail.

The Games continued to grow, attracting 2,504 competitors, to Stockholm in 1912, including the great all-rounder Jim Thorpe, who won both the decathlon and pentathlon. Thorpe had previously played a few games of baseball for a fee, and saw his medals stripped for this 'breach' of amateurism after complaints from Avery Brundage. They were reinstated in 1983, 30 years after his death. The Games at Stockholm were the first to fulfil Pierre de Coubertin's original idea. For the first time since the Games started in 1896, all five inhabited continents were represented with athletes competing in the same stadium.

The scheduled 1916 Summer Olympics were cancelled following the onset of World War I.

Interwar era
The 1920 Antwerp Games in war-ravaged Belgium were a subdued affair, but again drew a record number of competitors. This record only stood until 1924, when the Paris Games involved 3,000 competitors, the greatest of whom was Finnish runner Paavo Nurmi. The "Flying Finn" won three team gold medals and the individual 1,500 and 5,000 meter runs, the latter two on the same day.

The 1928 Amsterdam Games was notable for being the first games which allowed females to compete at track & field athletics, and benefited greatly from the general prosperity of the times alongside the first appearance of sponsorship of the games, from the Coca-Cola Company. The 1928 games saw the introduction of a standard medal design with the IOC choosing Giuseppe Cassioli's depiction of Greek goddess Nike and a winner being carried by a crowd of people. This design was used up until 1972.

The 1932 Los Angeles Games were affected by the Great Depression, which contributed to the low number of competitors.

The 1936 Berlin Games were seen by the German government as a golden opportunity to promote their ideology. The ruling Nazi Party commissioned film-maker Leni Riefenstahl to film the games. The result, Olympia, was widely considered to be a masterpiece, despite Hitler's theories of Aryan racial superiority being repeatedly shown up by "non-Aryan" athletes. In particular, African-American sprinter and long jumper Jesse Owens won four gold medals. The 1936 Berlin Games also saw the introduction of the Torch Relay.

Due to World War II, the 1940 Games (due to be held in Tokyo and temporarily relocated to Helsinki upon the outbreak of war) were cancelled. The 1944 Games were due to be held in London but were also cancelled; instead, London hosted the first games after the end of the war, in 1948.

After World War II
The first post-war Games were held in 1948 in London, with both Germany and Japan excluded. Dutch sprinter Fanny Blankers-Koen won four gold medals on the track, emulating Owens' achievement in Berlin.

At the 1952 Helsinki Games, the USSR team competed for the first time and quickly emerged as one of the dominant teams, finishing second in the number of gold and overall medals won. Their immediate success might be explained by the advent of the state-sponsored "full-time amateur athlete". The USSR entered teams of athletes who were all nominally students, soldiers, or working in a profession, but many of whom were in reality paid by the state to train on a full-time basis, hence violating amateur rules. Finland made a legend of an amiable Czechoslovak Army lieutenant named Emil Zátopek, who was intent on improving on his single gold and silver medals from 1948. Having first won both the 10,000- and 5,000-meter races, he also entered the marathon, despite having never previously raced at that distance. Pacing himself by chatting with the other race leaders, Zátopek led from about halfway, slowly dropping the remaining contenders to win by two and a half minutes, and completed a trio of wins.

The 1956 Melbourne Games were largely successful, with the exception of a water polo match between Hungary and the Soviet Union, which ended in a pitched battle between the teams on account of the Soviet invasion of Hungary. The equestrian events were held in Stockholm due to a foot-and-mouth disease outbreak in Britain at the time and the strict quarantine laws of Australia.

At the 1960 Rome Games, a young light-heavyweight boxer named Cassius Clay, later known as Muhammad Ali, arrived on the scene. Ali would later throw his gold medal away in disgust after being refused service in a whites-only restaurant in his home town of Louisville, Kentucky. He was awarded a new medal 36 years later at the 1996 Olympics in Atlanta. Other notable performers in 1960 included Wilma Rudolph, a gold medallist in the 100 meters, 200 meters, and 4 × 100 meters relay events.

The 1964 Tokyo Games were the first to be broadcast worldwide on television, enabled by the recent advent of communication satellites. These Games marked a turning point in the global visibility and popularity of the Olympics and are credited for heralding the modern age of telecommunications. Judo debuted as an official sport, and Dutch judoka Anton Geesink caused a stir when he won the final of the open weight division, defeating Akio Kaminaga in front of his home crowd.

Performances at the 1968 Games in Mexico City were affected by the altitude of the host city. These Games introduced the now-universal Fosbury flop, a technique which won American high jumper Dick Fosbury the gold medal. In the medal award ceremony for the men's 200-meter race, black American athletes Tommie Smith (gold medal winner) and John Carlos (bronze medal winner) took a stand for civil rights by raising their black-gloved fists and wearing black socks in lieu of shoes. The two athletes were subsequently expelled from the Games by the IOC. Věra Čáslavská, in protest against the 1968 Soviet-led invasion of Czechoslovakia, and the controversial decision by the judges on the balance beam and floor, turned her head down and away from the Soviet flag while the national anthem was played during the medal ceremony. She returned home as a heroine of the Czechoslovak people but was made an outcast by the Soviet-dominated government.

Politics again intervened at the 1972 Games in Munich, but this time with lethal consequences. A Palestinian terrorist group named Black September invaded the Olympic village and broke into the apartment of the Israeli delegation. They killed two Israelis and held nine others as hostages, demanding that Israel release numerous prisoners. When the Israeli government refused the terrorists' demands, the situation developed into a tense stand-off while negotiations continued. Eventually, the captors, still holding their hostages, were offered safe passage and taken to an airport, where they were ambushed by German security forces. In the ensuing firefight, 15 people were killed, including the nine captive Israeli athletes and five of the terrorists. After much debate, the decision was taken to continue the Games, but the proceedings were understandably dominated by these events. Some memorable athletic achievements did occur during these Games, notably the winning of a then-record seven gold medals by United States swimmer Mark Spitz, Finland's Lasse Virén taking back-to-back gold medals in the 5,000 meters and 10,000 meters, and the winning of three gold medals by Soviet gymnastic star Olga Korbut, who achieved a historic backflip off the high bar.

There was no such tragedy at the 1976 Montreal Games, but bad planning and fraud led to the cost of these Games far exceeding the budget. Costing $1.5 billion (equivalent to $ billion in ), the 1976 Summer Games were the most expensive in Olympic history (until the 2014 Winter Olympics) and it seemed, for a time, that the Olympics might no longer be a viable financial proposition. In retrospect, it is believed that contractors (suspected of being members of the Montreal Mafia) skimmed large sums of money from all levels of contracts while also profiting from the substitution of cheaper building materials of lesser quality, which may have contributed to the delays, poor construction, and excessive costs. In 1988, one such contractor, Giuseppe Zappia "was cleared of fraud charges that resulted from his work on Olympic facilities after two key witnesses died before testifying at his trial". The 1976 Games were boycotted by many African nations as a protest against a recent tour of apartheid-run South Africa by the New Zealand national rugby union team. Romanian gymnast Nadia Comăneci made history when she won the women's individual all-around gold medal with two of four possible perfect scores. She won two other individual events, with two perfect scores in the balance beam and all perfect scores in the uneven bars. Lasse Virén repeated his double gold in the 5,000 and 10,000 meters, making him the first athlete to ever win the distance double twice.

End of the 20th century
Following the Soviet Union's 1979 invasion of Afghanistan, 66 nations, including the United States, Canada, West Germany, and Japan, boycotted the 1980 Games held in Moscow. Eighty nations were represented at the Moscow Games – the smallest number since 1956. The boycott contributed to the 1980 Games being a less publicised and less competitive affair, which was dominated by the host country.

In 1984 the Soviet Union and 13 Soviet allies reciprocated by boycotting the 1984 Summer Olympics in Los Angeles. Romania and Yugoslavia, notably are the only two countries from the Eastern Bloc that did attend the 1984 Olympics. These games were perhaps the first games of a new era to make a profit. Although a boycott led by the Soviet Union depleted the field in certain sports, 140 National Olympic Committees took part, which was a record at the time. The Games were also the first time mainland China (People's Republic) participated.

According to British journalist Andrew Jennings, a KGB colonel stated that the agency's officers had posed as anti-doping authorities from the IOC to undermine doping tests and that Soviet athletes were "rescued with [these] tremendous efforts". On the topic of the 1980 Summer Olympics, a 1989 Australian study said "There is hardly a medal winner at the Moscow Games, certainly not a gold medal winner, who is not on one sort of drug or another: usually several kinds. The Moscow Games might as well have been called the Chemists' Games."

Documents obtained in 2016 revealed the Soviet Union's plans for a statewide doping system in track and field in preparation for the 1984 Summer Olympics in Los Angeles. Dated prior to the country's decision to boycott the Games, the document detailed the existing steroids operations of the programme, along with suggestions for further enhancements. The communication, directed to the Soviet Union's head of track and field, was prepared by Dr. Sergei Portugalov of the Institute for Physical Culture. Portugalov was also one of the main figures involved in the implementation of the Russian doping programme prior to the 2016 Summer Olympics.

The 1988 Games, in Seoul, was very well planned but the games were tainted when many of the athletes, most notably men's 100 metres winner Ben Johnson, failed mandatory drug tests. Despite splendid drug-free performances by many individuals, the number of people who failed screenings for performance-enhancing chemicals overshadowed the games.

The 1992 Barcelona Games featured the admittance of players from one of the North American top leagues, the NBA, exemplified by but not limited to US basketball's "Dream Team". The 1992 games also saw the reintroduction to the Games of several smaller European states which had been incorporated into the Soviet Union since World War II. At these games, gymnast Vitaly Scherbo set an inaugural medal record of five individual gold medals at a Summer Olympics, and equaled the inaugural record set by Eric Heiden at the 1980 Winter Olympics.

By then the process of choosing a location for the Games had become a commercial concern; there were widespread allegations of corruption potentially affecting the IOC's decision process.

At the Atlanta 1996 Summer Olympics, the highlight was 200 meters runner Michael Johnson annihilating the world record in front of a home crowd. Canadians savoured Donovan Bailey's recording gold medal run in the 100-meter dash. This was popularly felt to be an appropriate recompense for the previous national disgrace involving Ben Johnson. There were also emotional scenes, such as when Muhammad Ali, clearly affected by Parkinson's disease, lit the Olympic torch and received a replacement medal for the one he had discarded in 1960. The latter event took place in the basketball arena. The atmosphere at the Games was marred, however, when a bomb exploded during the celebration in Centennial Olympic Park. In June 2003, the principal suspect in this bombing, Eric Robert Rudolph, was arrested.

The 2000 Summer Olympics, held in Sydney, Australia, showcased individual performances by locals favorites Ian Thorpe in the pool and Cathy Freeman, an Indigenous Australian whose triumph in the 400 meters united a packed stadium., Briton Steve Redgrave who won a rowing gold medal in an unprecedented fifth consecutive Olympics, and Eric "the Eel" Moussambani, a swimmer from Equatorial Guinea, received wide media coverage when he completed the 100 meter freestyle swim in by far the slowest time in Olympic history. He nevertheless won the heat as both his opponents had been disqualified for false starts. His female compatriot Paula Barila Bolopa also received media attention for her record-slow and struggling but courageous performance. The Sydney Games also saw the first appearance of a joint North and South Korean contingent at the opening ceremonies, though they competed in all events as different teams. Controversy occurred in the Women's Artistic Gymnastics when the vaulting horse was set to the wrong height during the All-Around Competition.

Start of the 21st century
In 2004, the Olympic Games returned to their birthplace in Athens, Greece. At least $7.2 billion was spent on the 2004 Games, including $1.5 billion on security. Michael Phelps won his first Olympic medals, tallying six gold and two bronze medals. Pyrros Dimas, winning a bronze medal, became the most decorated weightlifter of all time with four Olympic medals, three gold and one bronze. Although unfounded reports of potential terrorism drove crowds away from the preliminary competitions at the first weekend of the Olympics (14–15 August 2004), attendance picked up as the Games progressed. A third of the tickets failed to sell, but ticket sales still topped figures from the Seoul and Barcelona Olympics (1988 and 1992). IOC President Jacques Rogge characterised Greece's organisation as outstanding and its security precautions as flawless. All 202 NOCs participated at the Athens Games with over 11,000 participants.

The 2008 Summer Olympics was held in Beijing, People's Republic of China. Several new events were held, including the new discipline of BMX for both men and women. Women competed in the steeplechase for the first time. The fencing programme was expanded to include all six events for both men and women; previously, women had not been able to compete in team foil or sabre events, although women's team épée and men's team foil were dropped for these Games. Also, the doubles events in table tennis were replaced by team events. American swimmer Michael Phelps set a record for gold medals at a single Games with eight, and tied the record of most gold medals by a single competitor previously held by both Eric Heiden and Vitaly Scherbo. Another notable star of the Games was Jamaican sprinter Usain Bolt, who became the first male athlete ever to set world records in the finals of both the 100 and 200 metres in the same Games. Equestrian events were held in Hong Kong.

London held the 2012 Summer Olympics, becoming the first city to host the Olympic Games three times. In his closing address, Jacques Rogge described the Games as "Happy and glorious". The host nation won 29 gold medals, the best haul for Great Britain since the 1908 Games in London. The United States returned to the top of the medal table after China dominated in 2008. The IOC had removed baseball and softball from the 2012 programme. The London Games were successful on a commercial level because they were the first in history to completely sell out every ticket, with as many as 1 million applications for 40,000 tickets for both the Opening Ceremony and the 100m Men's Sprint Final. Such was the demand for tickets to all levels of each event that there was controversy over seats being set aside for sponsors and National Delegations which went unused in the early days. A system of reallocation was put in place so the empty seats were filled throughout the Games.

Recent Games

Rio de Janeiro in Brazil hosted the 2016 Summer Olympics, becoming the first South American city to host the Olympics, the second Olympic host city in Latin America, after Mexico City in 1968, as well as the third city in the Southern Hemisphere to host the Olympics after Melbourne, Australia, in 1956 and Sydney, Australia, in 2000. The preparation for these Games was overshadowed by controversies, including political instability and an economic crisis in the host country, health and safety concerns surrounding the Zika virus, and significant pollution in the Guanabara Bay. However, these concerns were superseded by a state-sponsored doping scandal involving Russian athletes at the Winter Olympics held two years earlier, which affected the participation of its athletes in these Games. 

The 2020 Summer Olympics were originally scheduled to take place from 24 July to 9 August 2020 in Tokyo, Japan. The city was the fifth in history to host the Games twice and the first Asian city to have this title. Due to the COVID-19 pandemic, the then-Japanese Prime Minister Shinzo Abe, the IOC and the Tokyo Organising Committee announced that the 2020 Games were to be delayed until 2021, marking the first time that the Olympic Games have been postponed. Unlike previous Olympics, these Games took place without spectators due to concerns over COVID-19 and a state of emergency imposed in the host city. Nevertheless, the Tokyo 2020 Olympic Games featured many memorable moments and feats of technical excellence. One star of the games, the US gymnast Simone Biles, gracefully bowed out to focus on her mental health, but later returned to claim an individual bronze medal. Norway's Karsten Warholm smashed his own world record in the 400m hurdles.

Sports

There has been a total of 42 sports, spanning 55 disciplines, included in the Olympic programme at one point or another in the history of the Games. The schedule has comprised 33 sports for recent Summer Olympics (2020), with 32 sports planned for the next Summer Olympics (2024).

The various Olympic Sports federations are grouped under a common umbrella association, called the Association of Summer Olympic International Federations (ASOIF).

Qualification
Qualification rules for each of the Olympic sports are set by the International Sports Federation (IF) that governs that sport's international competition.

For individual sports, competitors typically qualify by attaining a certain place in a major international event or on the IF's ranking list. There is a general rule that a maximum of three individual athletes may represent each nation per competition. National Olympic Committees (NOCs) may enter a limited number of qualified competitors in each event, and the NOC decides which qualified competitors to select as representatives in each event if more have attained the benchmark than can be entered.

Nations most often qualify teams for team sports through continental qualifying tournaments, in which each continental association is given a certain number of spots in the Olympic tournament. Each nation may be represented by no more than one team per competition; a team consists of just two people in some sports.

Popularity of Olympic sports
The IOC divides Summer Olympic sports into five categories (A – E) based on popularity, gauged by six criteria: television viewing figures (40%), internet popularity (20%), public surveys (15%), ticket requests (10%), press coverage (10%), and number of national federations (5%). The category of a sport determines the share of Olympic revenue received by that sport's International Federation. Sports that were new to the 2016 Olympics (rugby and golf) have been placed in Category E.

The current categories are:

Aquatics encompasses artistic swimming, diving, swimming, and water polo.

All-time medal table

The table below uses official data provided by the IOC.

Medal leaders by year

Number of occurrences
  — 18 times
  — 6 times
  — once
  — once
  — once
  — once
  — once

List of Summer Olympic Games
The IOC has never decided which events of the early Games were "Olympic" and which were not. The founder of the modern Olympics, Pierre de Coubertin, ceded that determination to the organisers of those Games. 

A.   The IOC site for the 1896, 1900 and 1904 Summer Olympic Games does not include Mixed teams (teams of athletes from different nations) as separate "nation" when counting participating nations. At the same time the IOC shows Mixed team in the results of competitions where these teams competed. Thus, specified number of national teams plus Mixed teams participated in the Games.
B. At an earlier time the IOC database for the 1900 Summer Olympics listed 85 medal events, 24 participating countries and 997 athletes (22 women, 975 men). The Olympic historian and author, Bill Mallon, whose studies have shed light on the topic, suggested the number 95 events satisfying all four retrospective selection criteria (restricted to amateurs, international participation, open to all competitors and without handicapping) and now should be considered as Olympic events. In July 2021, the IOC upgraded its complete online database of all Olympic results explicitly to incorporate the data of the Olympic historians website, Olympedia.org, thus accepting Mallon's recommendation (based on four applied criteria) for events of the 1900 Olympic Games. The eleven events, the results of which had nevertheless been shown within the earlier IOC database, have been added over the former total of 85. Оne shooting event (20 metre military pistol, which was an event for professionals) have been removed. Acceptance of Mallon's recommendation increased the number of events to 95, and also entailed increasing the number of participation countries up to 26 and athletes up to 1226. After upgrading of the IOC online database the IOC web site results section contains 95 events. However the IOC webpage for the 1900 Summer Olympics shows a total of 96 (not 95) medal events, 26 participating countries and 1226 athletes. The reason for the discrepancy in the number of events on the IOC webpage is unknown. Furthermore, the IOC factsheet "The Games of the Olympiad" of November 2021 refers to 95 events, but still refers to old numbers of participating countries (24) and athletes (997).
C. According to the International Olympic Committee, 26 nations sent competitors to this edition. The concept of "national teams" chosen by National Olympic Committees did not exist at this point in time. When counting the number of participating countries in the early Olympic Games, the IOC does not take into account otherwise unrepresented countries whose citizens competed for other countries. Modern research shows that at the 1900 Olympics, the athletes of at least four otherwise unrepresented countries (Canada, Luxembourg, Colombia, New Zealand) competed for other countries in both individual and team sports. The IOC website lists all of them in the results section under their nationalities, but does not include their countries among the 26 participating countries.
D. The IOC webpage for the 1904 Summer Olympics sets the number at 95 events, while at one time the IOC webpage listed 91. The figure of 91 is sourced to a work by Olympic historian and author, Bill Mallon, whose studies have shed light on the topic. Events satisfying all four of these retrospective selection criteria — restricted to amateurs, allowing international participation, open to all competitors and without handicapping — are now regarded as Olympic events.
E.   Although the Games of 1916, 1940, and 1944 were cancelled, the Roman numerals for those Games were still applied because the official titles of the Summer Games count the Olympiads, not the Games themselves, per the Olympic Charter. This contrasts with the Winter Olympics, which ignore the cancelled Winter Games of 1940 and 1944 in their numeric count.
F. The IOC webpage for the 1920 Summer Olympics gives the figure of 156 events, while at one time the IOC webpage listed 154 (difference was two sailing events in Amsterdam).
G. IOC records state Hitler opened these Games as "Chancellor" (Head of Government), but in 1934 that office was consolidated with "President" (Head of State) into "Führer und Reichskanzler", or "Führer".
H. The IOC webpage for the 1956 Summer Olympics gives a total of 151 events (145 events in Melbourne and six equestrian events in Stockholm).
I. Owing to Australian quarantine laws, six equestrian events were held in Stockholm for the 1956 Summer Olympics several months before the other events in Melbourne; five of the 72 nations that competed in the equestrian events in Stockholm did not attend the main Games in Melbourne.
J. The 1972 Summer Olympics was originally scheduled to end on 10 September 1972, but was postponed to a day on 11 September after events had been suspended for 34 hours due to the Munich massacre, which happened after day 9.
K. IOC records state Brezhnev opened the Moscow Games as "President", a title used at that time by the Chairman of the Presidium of the Supreme Soviet, or de jure head of state.  (The office of President of the Soviet Union was not created until 1990, a year before the nation broke up.) Though Brezhnev was also de facto ruler as General Secretary of the Communist Party, that title is not reflected in IOC records.
L. IOC records state Hu Jintao opened the Beijing Games as "President", de jure head of state. Though Hu was also de facto ruler as General Secretary of the Chinese Communist Party, that title is not reflected in IOC records.
M. Originally scheduled for 24 July – 9 August 2020, the Games were postponed by one year due to the COVID-19 pandemic. However, the event was still referred to as the 2020 Summer Olympics (marking the 32nd Olympiad) to preserve the four-year Olympiad cycle.
N. Number of athletes will be in limited quota into an equal number of gender participants.

See also

 List of participating nations at the Summer Olympic Games
 List of Olympic Games scandals and controversies
 Lists of Olympic medalists
 Olympic Games ceremony
 Olympic Stadium
 Summer Paralympic Games
 Paralympic Games
 Winter Olympic Games

References

External links

 
 Candidate Cities for future Olympic Games

 
Recurring sporting events established in 1896

Quadrennial sporting events
Summer multi-sport events